Mustoe (also Pinckney) is an unincorporated community in Highland County, Virginia, United States. The community is situated along U.S. Route 220 on the banks of the Jackson River. According to the National Weather Service, the only tornado on record in Highland County occurred near Mustoe in 1959.

References

Unincorporated communities in Highland County, Virginia
Unincorporated communities in Virginia